"I Caught Fire" is the third single from American rock band the Used's second studio album, In Love and Death (2004). It was released to radio in February 2005.

Track listing
CD single

Personnel
The Used
 Bert McCracken – vocals
 Quinn Allman – guitar
 Jeph Howard – bass
 Branden Steineckert – drums

Charts

References

The Used songs
2004 songs
2005 singles
Music videos directed by Kevin Kerslake
Reprise Records singles
Song recordings produced by John Feldmann
Songs written by Bert McCracken
Songs written by Branden Steineckert
Songs written by Jeph Howard
Songs written by Quinn Allman